Real estate economics is the application of economic techniques to real estate markets. It tries to describe, explain, and predict patterns of prices, supply, and demand. The closely related field of  housing economics is narrower in scope, concentrating on residential real estate markets, while the research on  real estate trends focuses on the business and structural changes affecting the industry. Both draw on partial equilibrium analysis (supply and demand), urban economics, spatial economics, basic and extensive research, surveys, and finance.

Overview of real estate markets
The main participants in real estate markets are:

 Users: These people are both owners and tenants. They purchase houses or commercial property as an investment and also to live in or utilize as a business. Businesses may or may not require buildings to use land. The land can be used in other ways, such as for agriculture, forestry or mining.
 Owners: These people are pure investors. They do not occupy the real estate that they purchase. Typically, they rent out or lease the property to other parties.
 Renters: These people are pure consumers.
 Developers: These people are involved in developing land for buildings for sale in the market.
 Renovators: These people supply refurbished properties to the market.
 Facilitators: This group includes banks, real estate brokers, lawyers, government regulators, and others that facilitate the purchase and sale of real estate.
The choices of users, owners, and renters form the demand side of the market, while the choices of owners, developers and renovators form the supply side. In order to apply simple supply and demand analysis to real estate markets, a number of modifications need to be made to standard microeconomic assumptions and procedures. In particular, the unique characteristics of the real estate market must be accommodated. These characteristics include:
 Durability. Real estate is durable. A building can last for decades or even centuries, and the land underneath it is practically indestructible. As a result, real estate markets are modelled as a stock/flow market. Although the proportion is highly variable over time, the vast majority of the building supply consists of the stock of existing buildings, while a small proportion consists of the flow of new development. The stock of real estate supply in any period is determined by the existing stock in the previous period, the rate of deterioration of the existing stock, the rate of renovation of the existing stock, and the flow of new development in the current period. The effect of real estate market adjustments tend to be mitigated by the relatively large stock of existing buildings.
 Heterogeneity. Every unit of real estate is unique in terms of its location, the building, and its financing. This makes pricing difficult, increases search costs, creates information asymmetry, and greatly restricts substitutability. To get around this problem, economists, beginning with Muth (1960), define supply in terms of service units; that is, any physical unit can be deconstructed into the services that it provides. Olsen (1969) describes these units of housing services as an unobservable theoretical construct. Housing stock depreciates, making it qualitatively different from new buildings. The market-equilibrating process operates across multiple quality levels. Further, the real estate market is typically divided into residential, commercial, and industrial segments. It can also be further divided into subcategories like recreational, income-generating, historical or protected, and the like.
 High transaction costs. Buying and/or moving into a home costs much more than most types of transactions. The costs include search costs, real estate fees, moving costs, legal fees, land transfer taxes, and deed registration fees. Transaction costs for the seller typically range between 1.5% and 6% of the purchase price. In some countries in continental Europe, transaction costs for both buyer and seller can range between 15% and 20%.
 Long time delays. The market adjustment process is subject to time delays due to the length of time it takes to finance, design, and construct new supply and also due to the relatively slow rate of change of demand. Because of these lags, there is great potential for disequilibrium in the short run. Adjustment mechanisms tend to be slow relative to more fluid markets.
 Both an investment good and a consumption good. Real estate can be purchased with the expectation of attaining a return (an investment good), with the intention of using it (a consumption good), or both. These functions may be separated (with market participants concentrating on one or the other function) or combined (in the case of the person that lives in a house that they own). This dual nature of the good means that it is not uncommon for people to over-invest in real estate that is, to invest more money in an asset than it is worth on the open market.
Immobility. Real estate is locationally immobile (save for mobile homes, but the land underneath them is still immobile). Consumers come to the good rather than the good going to the consumer. Because of this, there can be no physical marketplace. This spatial fixity means that market adjustment must occur by people moving to dwelling units, rather than the movement of the goods. For example, if tastes change and more people demand suburban houses, people must find housing in the suburbs, because it is impossible to bring their existing house and lot to the suburb (even a mobile homeowner, who could move the house, must still find a new lot). Spatial fixity combined with the close proximity of housing units in urban areas suggest the potential for externalities inherent in a given location.

Housing industry
The housing industry is the development, construction, and sale of homes. Its interests are represented in the United States by the National Association of Home Builders (NAHB). In Australia the trade association representing the residential housing industry is the Housing Industry Association. It also refers to the housing market which means the supply and demand for houses, usually in a particular country or region. Housing market includes features as supply of housing, demand for housing, house prices, rented sector and government intervention in the Housing market.

Demand for housing
The main determinants of the demand for housing are demographic. But other factors, like income, price of housing, cost and availability of credit, consumer preferences, investor preferences, price of substitutes, and price of complements, all play a role.

The core demographic variables are population size and population growth: the more people in the economy, the greater the demand for housing. But this is an oversimplification. It is necessary to consider family size, the age composition of the family, the number of first and second children, net migration (immigration minus emigration), non-family household formation, the number of double-family households, death rates, divorce rates, and marriages. In housing economics, the elemental unit of analysis is not the individual, as it is in standard partial equilibrium models. Rather, it is households, which demand housing services: typically one household per house. The size and demographic composition of households is variable and not entirely exogenous. It is endogenous to the housing market in the sense that as the price of housing services increase, household size will tend also to increase.

Income is also an important determinant. Empirical measures of the income elasticity of demand in North America range from 0.5 to 0.9 (De Leeuw 1971). If permanent income elasticity is measured, the results are slightly higher (Kain and Quigley 1975) because transitory income varies from year to year and across individuals, so positive transitory income will tend to cancel out negative transitory income. Many housing economists use permanent income rather than annual income because of the high cost of purchasing real estate. For many people, real estate will be the costliest item they will ever buy.

The price of housing is also an important factor. The price elasticity of the demand for housing services in North America is estimated as negative 0.7 by Polinsky and Ellwood (1979), and as negative 0.9 by Maisel, Burnham, and Austin (1971).

An individual household's housing demand can be modelled with standard utility/choice theory. The equality indicates that the money spent on all the goods and services must be equal to the available income. Because this is unrealistic, the model must be adjusted to allow for borrowing and saving. A measure of wealth, lifetime income, or permanent income is required. The model must also be adjusted to account for the heterogeneity of real estate. This can be done by deconstructing the utility function. By varying the price of housing services and solving for points of optimal utility, the household's demand schedule for housing services can be constructed. Market demand is calculated by summing all individual household demands.

Supply of housing

Developers produce housing supply using land, labour, and various inputs, such as electricity and building materials. The quantity of new supply is determined by the cost of these inputs, the price of the existing stock of houses, and the technology of production. For a typical single-family dwelling in suburban North America, one can assign approximate cost percentages as follows: acquisition costs, 10%; site improvement costs, 11%; labour costs, 26%; materials costs, 31%; finance costs, 3%; administrative costs, 15%; and marketing costs, 4%. Multi-unit residential dwellings typically break down as follows: acquisition costs, 7%; site improvement costs, 8%; labour costs, 27%; materials costs, 33%; finance costs, 3%; administrative costs, 17%; and marketing costs, 5%. Public-subdivision requirements can increase development costs by up to 3%, depending on the jurisdiction. Differences in building codes account for about a 2% variation in development costs. However, these subdivision and building-code costs typically increase the market value of the buildings by at least the amount of their cost outlays. This production function must, however, be adjusted to account for the refurbishing and augmentation of existing buildings. To do this, a second production function is constructed that includes the stock of existing housing and their ages as determinants. The two functions are summed, yielding the total production function. Alternatively, a hedonic pricing model can be regressed.

The long-run price elasticity of supply is quite high. George Fallis (1985) estimates it as 8.2, but in the short run, supply tends to be very price-inelastic. Supply-price elasticity depends on the elasticity of substitution and supply restrictions. There is significant substitutability, both between land and materials and between labour and materials. In high-value locations, developers can typically construct multi-story concrete buildings to reduce the amount of expensive land used. As labour costs have increased since the 1950s, new materials and capital-intensive techniques have been employed to reduce the amount of labour used. However, supply restrictions can significantly affect substitutability. In particular, the lack of supply of skilled labour (and  labour-union requirements) can constrain the substitution from capital to labour. Land availability can also constrain substitutability if the area of interest is delineated (i.e., the larger the area, the more suppliers of land, and the more substitution that is possible). Land-use controls such as zoning  bylaws can also reduce land substitutability.

Adjustment mechanism
The basic adjustment mechanism is a stock/flow model to reflect the fact that about 98% the market is existing stock and about 2% is the flow of new buildings.

In the adjacent diagram, the stock of housing supply is presented in the left panel while the new flow is in the right panel. There are four steps in the basic adjustment mechanism. First, the initial equilibrium price (Ro) is determined by the intersection of the supply of existing housing stock (SH) and the demand for housing (D). This rent is then translated into value (Vo) via discounting cash flows. Value is calculated by dividing current period rents by the discount rate, that is, as a perpetuity. Then value is compared to construction costs (CC) in order to determine whether profitable opportunities exist for developers. The intersection of construction costs and the value of housing services determine the maximum level of new housing starts (HSo). Finally the amount of housing starts in the current period is added to the available stock of housing in the next period. In the next period, supply curve SH will shift to the right by amount HSo.

Adjustment with depreciation

The diagram to the right shows the effects of depreciation. If the supply of existing housing deteriorates due to wear, then the stock of housing supply depreciates. Because of this, the supply of housing (SHo) will shift to the left (to SH1) resulting in a new equilibrium demand of R1 (since the number of homes decreased, but demand still exists). The increase of demand from Ro to R1 will shift the value function up (from Vo to V1). As a result, more houses can be produced profitably and housing starts will increase (from HSo to HS1). Then the supply of housing will shift back to its initial position (SH1 to SHo).

Increase in demand
 
The diagram on the right shows the effects of an increase in demand in the short run. If there is an increase in the demand for housing, such as the shift from Do to D1 there will be either a price or quantity adjustment, or both. For the price to stay the same, the supply of housing must increase. That is, supply SHo must increase by HS.

Increase in costs

The diagram on the right shows the effects of an increase in costs in the short-run. If construction costs increase (say from CCo to CC1), developers will find their business less profitable and will be more selective in their ventures. In addition some developers may leave the industry. The quantity of housing starts will decrease (HSo to HS1). This will eventually reduce the level of supply (from SHo to SH1) as the existing stock of housing depreciates. Prices will tend to rise (from Ro to R1).

Real estate financing

There are different ways of real estate financing: governmental and commercial sources and institutions. A homebuyer or builder can obtain financial aid from savings and loan associations, commercial banks, savings banks, mortgage bankers and brokers, life insurance companies, credit unions, federal agencies, individual investors, and builders.

Over the last decade, residential prices increased every year on average by double digits in Beijing or Shanghai. However many observers and researchers argue that fundamentals of the housing sector, both sector-specific and macroeconomic, may have been the driving force behind housing price volatility.

Savings and loan associations

The most important purpose of these institutions is to make mortgage loans on residential property. These organizations, which also are known as savings associations, building and loan associations, cooperative banks (in New England), or homestead associations (in  Louisiana), are the primary source of financial assistance to a large segment of American homeowners. As home-financing institutions, they give primary attention to single-family residences and are equipped to make loans in this area.

Some of the most important characteristics of a savings and loan association are:

 It is generally a locally owned and privately managed home-financing institution.
 It receives individuals' savings and uses these funds to make long-term amortized loans to home purchasers.
 It makes loans for the construction, purchase, repair, or refinancing of houses.
 It is state or federally chartered.

Commercial banks

Due to changes in banking laws and policies, commercial banks are increasingly active in home financing. In acquiring mortgages on real estate, these institutions follow two main practices:

 Some banks maintain active and well-organized departments whose primary function is to compete actively for real estate loans. In areas lacking specialized real estate financial institutions, these banks become the source for residential and farm mortgage loans.
 Banks acquire mortgages by simply purchasing them from mortgage bankers or dealers.

In addition, dealer service companies, which were originally used to obtain car loans for permanent lenders such as commercial banks, wanted to broaden their activity beyond their local area. In recent years, however, such companies have concentrated on acquiring mobile home loans in volume for both commercial banks and savings and loan associations. Service companies obtain these loans from retail dealers, usually on a non-recourse basis. Almost all bank or service company agreements contain a credit insurance policy that protects the lender if the consumer defaults.

Savings banks

These depository financial institutions are federally chartered, primarily accept consumer deposits, and make home mortgage loans.

Mortgage bankers and brokers

Mortgage bankers are companies or individuals that originate mortgage loans, sell them to other investors, service the monthly payments, and may act as agents to dispense funds for taxes and insurance.

Mortgage brokers present homebuyers with loans from a variety of loan sources. Their income comes from the lender making the loan, just like with any other bank. Because they can tap a variety of lenders, they can shop on behalf of the borrower and achieve the best available terms. Despite legislation that could favor major banks, mortgage bankers and brokers keep the market competitive so the largest lenders must continue to compete on price and service. According to Don Burnette of Brightgreen Homeloans in Port Orange, Florida, "The mortgage banker and broker conduit is vital to maintain competitive balance in the mortgage industry. Without it, the largest lenders would be able to unduly influence rates and pricing, potentially hurting the consumer. Competition drives every organization in this industry to constantly improve on their performance, and the consumer is the winner in this scenario."

Life insurance companies
Life insurance companies are another source of financial assistance. These companies lend on real estate as one form of investment and adjust their portfolios from time to time to reflect changing economic conditions. Individuals seeking a loan from an insurance company can deal directly with a local branch office or with a local real estate broker who acts as loan correspondent for one or more insurance companies.

Credit unions

These cooperative financial institutions are organized by people who share a common bond—for example, employees of a company, labor union, or religious group. Some credit unions offer home loans in addition to other financial services.

Federally supported agencies
Under certain conditions and fund limitations, the Veterans Administration (VA) makes direct loans to creditworthy veterans in housing credit shortage areas designated by the VA's administrator. Such areas are generally rural and small cities and towns not near the metropolitan or commuting areas of large cities—areas where GI loans from private institutions are not available.

The federally supported agencies referred to here do not include the so-called second-layer lenders who enter the scene after the mortgage is arranged between the lending institution and the individual home buyer.

Real estate investment trusts

Real estate investment trusts (REITs), which began when the Real Estate Investment Trust Act became effective on January 1, 1961, are available. REITs, like savings and loan associations, are committed to real estate lending and can and do serve the national real estate market, although some specialization has occurred in their activities.

In the United States, REITs generally pay little or no federal income tax but are subject to a number of special requirements set forth in the  Internal Revenue Code, one of which is the requirement to annually distribute at least 90% of their taxable income in the form of dividends to shareholders.

Other sources
Individual investors constitute a fairly large but somewhat declining source of money for home mortgage loans. Experienced observers claim that these lenders prefer shorter-term obligations and usually restrict their loans to less than two-thirds of the value of the residential property. Likewise, building contractors sometimes accept second mortgages in partial payment of the construction price of a home if the purchaser is unable to raise the total amount of the down payment above the first mortgage money offered.

In addition, homebuyers or builders can save their money using FSBO in order not to pay extra fees.

See also
 Affordable housing
 Affordability of housing in the United Kingdom
 Australian property market
 Effective gross income
 Investment rating for real estate
 Land value tax
 Real estate trends
 Real estate business
 Real estate development
 Real estate bubble
 United States housing bubble
 Sunshine tax

Notes

References
 Bourne, L. S. and Hitchcock, J. R. editors., (1978) Urban Housing Markets :Recent directions in research and policy, University of Toronto Press, Toronto, 1978.

 Fallis, G. (1985) Housing Economics, Butterworth, Toronto, 1985.

 Kain J. F. and Quigley J. M. (1975) Housing Markets and Racial Discrimination, National Bureau of Economic Research, New York.
 Kawaguchi, Y., (2013), Real Estate Economics, Seibunsha, Tokyo.
 Kawaguchi, Y., (2001), Real Estate Financial Engineering", Seibunsha, Tokyo.

 Muth, R. (1960) “The demand for non-farm housing”, in A.C.Harberger, ed., The demand for durable goods'', University of Chicago Press, Chicago, 1960.

External links

 Jose Francisco Bellod Redondo, University of Malaga, Detection of real estate bubbles: the Spanish case: performance of Spanish housing market between 1989 and 2009 (in Spanish), May 2011

 Urban economics
 Real estate industry